The La Perouse United are an Australian rugby league football team based in La Perouse, New South Wales a suburb of south-central Sydney they play in the South Sydney District Junior Rugby Football League.

Notable Juniors
Chick Donnelley (1946-47 St George Dragons)
Eric Simms (1965-75 South Sydney Rabbitohs
Russell Fairfax (1974-81 Sydney Roosters & South Sydney Rabbitohs)
Nathan Gibbs (1978-84 South Sydney Rabbitohs & Parramatta Eels)
Sean Garlick (1990-99 South Sydney Rabbitohs & Sydney Roosters)
Tom Jensen (1993-95)
Gavin Lester (1998-04 Canterbury Bulldogs & Sydney Roosters)
Reni Maitua (2004-14 Canterbury Bulldogs, Cronulla Sharks & Parramatta Eels)
Nathan Merritt (2002-14 South Sydney Rabbitohs, Cronulla Sharks)
Beau Champion (2005-15 South Sydney Rabbitohs, Melbourne Storm, Gold Coast Titans & Parramatta Eels)
Fred Briggs (2007-08 Canterbury Bulldogs)
Dylan Farrell (2010- South Sydney Rabbitohs & St George Illawarra Dragons)
James Roberts (2011- South Sydney Rabbitohs, Penrith Panthers, Gold Coast Titans & Brisbane Broncos)
Nathan Peats (2011- South Sydney Rabbitohs, Parramatta Eels & Gold Coast Titans)
Adam Reynolds (2012- South Sydney Rabbitohs)
Craig Garvey (2013- St George Illawarra Dragons & Canterbury Bulldogs)
Alex Johnston (2014- South Sydney Rabbitohs)
Tyrone Phillips (2015- Canterbury Bulldogs & Penrith Panthers)
Josh Addo-Carr (2016- Wests Tigers & Melbourne Storm)
Grant Garvey (2016- Sydney Roosters)
Tom Wright (2018- Manly Sea Eagles)
B-I Manda (local rugby league legend) 1995-2022

See also

NSW Koori Knockout

References

External links
La Perouse United Fox Sports pulse

Rugby league teams in Sydney
Rugby clubs established in 1968
1968 establishments in Australia
La Perouse, New South Wales